Room to Breathe may refer to:
 Room to Breathe (Delbert McClinton album)
 Room to Breathe (Reba McEntire album)
 Room to Breathe (ZOEgirl album)
 "Room to Breathe" (You Me at Six song) (2014)
 "Room to Breathe", a song by Blindspott from Blindspott
 "Room to Breathe", a song by Andrew W.K.
 Room to Breathe, a 2006 short film featuring Art Alexakis